Genesis was a professional wrestling supercard event produced by Major League Wrestling (MLW), which took place on June 15, 2002 at the Viking Hall in Philadelphia, Pennsylvania. It was the inaugural event by MLW and featured an eight-man single elimination tournament to crown the inaugural World Heavyweight Champion.

Nine professional wrestling matches were taped at the event with seven matches of the World Heavyweight Championship tournament being televised. The tournament concluded with Shane Douglas defeating Taiyo Kea and Vampiro in a three-way match in the finals of the tournament to win the title.

Event

Quarterfinals

The event featured a tournament to crown the new MLW World Heavyweight Champion. The opening match of the tournament took place between Jerry Lynn and La Parka. After avoiding a corkscrew moonsault by Parka, Lynn executed a tornado DDT off the ropes for the win.

In the next match, Vampiro took on Christopher Daniels. After avoiding a lariat by Daniels, Vampiro hit a lifting side slam to Daniels for the win.

Next, Taiyo Kea was scheduled to take on Bam Bam Bigelow but Bigelow did not show up and was subsequently replaced by The Wall. Kea countered a powerbomb by Wall into a hurricanrana and executed a bridging Northern Lights suplex on Wall for the win.

It was followed by the last quarterfinal match between Shane Douglas and Steve Corino. Corino attempted to deliver an Old School Expulsion to Douglas but Douglas reversed it into a belly to belly suplex for the win.

Semifinals
The first semifinal match in the tournament took place between Jerry Lynn and Shane Douglas. Douglas countered a cradle piledriver by Lynn and nailed a Pittsburgh Plunge to Lynn for the win.

The second semifinal took place between Taiyo Kea and Vampiro. Near the end of the match, Kea nailed a Hawaiian Smasher to Vampiro but the 17-minute time limit expired and the match ended in a time limit draw. Vampiro demanded five more minutes but Shane Douglas showed up to begin a three-way dance against both Vampiro and Kea.

Final
The tournament final three-way dance took place between Shane Douglas, Taiyo Kea and Vampiro. Kea and Vampiro quickly took down Douglas and then Vampiro attempted to hit a spin kick to Douglas but Douglas countered it and Vampiro accidentally hit Kea which allowed Douglas to hit a belly to belly suplex to Vampiro to win the World Heavyweight Championship. Douglas then insulted the MLW title belt by spitting on it and throwing it down in a repetition of him throwing down the NWA World Heavyweight Championship on August 27, 1994. Referee John Finnegan threatened to suspend Douglas if he did not defend the title.

Aftermath

In light of Shane Douglas' controversial actions, he was stripped off the World Heavyweight Championship on September 13. A match was set up between Jerry Lynn and Satoshi Kojima to determine a new champion at Reload, which Kojima won. MLW later refused to acknowledge Douglas' reign as champion and officially recognized Kojima as the first-ever MLW World Heavyweight Champion.

Results

Tournament brackets

References

External links
Major League Wrestling official website

2002 in professional wrestling
Professional wrestling in Philadelphia
2002 in Philadelphia
June 2002 sports events in the United States
Major League Wrestling shows
Events in Philadelphia